Parnell was a parliamentary electorate in the city of Auckland, New Zealand, from 1861 to 1954, with one break of eight years.

Population centres
In the 1860 electoral redistribution, the House of Representatives increased the number of representatives by 12, reflecting the immense population growth since the original electorates were established in 1853. The redistribution created 15 additional electorates with between one and three members, and Parnell was one of the single-member electorates. The electorates were distributed to provinces so that every province had at least two members. Within each province, the number of registered electors by electorate varied greatly. The Parnell electorate had 268 registered electors for the 1861 election.

Over the years, Parnell sometimes comprised a small area, and sometimes it covered quite a large area. Much of the area covered fluctuated between the Parnell and  electorates.

In 1927 the Representation Commission proposed altering the Parnell boundaries; which if confirmed would have made the electorate "dry" or no-licence, and without an authority which could issue temporary licences for the Ellerslie and Alexandra Park raceways. Following objections, the boundary between the Parnell and  electorates was adjusted to include a hotel in the Parnell electorate (so retaining its licensing committee).

In the 1937 electoral redistribution, Parnell was abolished and replaced with the  electorate, covering almost exactly the same area as Parnell had since the 1927 electoral redistribution.

The 1941 New Zealand census had been postponed due to World War II, so the 1946 electoral redistribution had to take ten years of population growth and movements into account. The North Island gained a further two electorates from the South Island due to faster population growth. The abolition of the country quota through the Electoral Amendment Act, 1945 reduced the number and increased the size of rural electorates. None of the existing electorates remained unchanged, 27 electorates were abolished, 19 electorates were created for the first time, and eight former electorates were re-established, including Parnell. The Parnell electorate existed alongside the Remuera electorate. Most of the Parnell electorate's area went once again to the Remuera electorate.

History
The electorate was represented by ten Members of Parliament:

Members of Parliament
Key

Election results

1951 election

1949 election

1946 election

1935 election

1931 election

1930 by-election

1928 election

1919 election

 
 
 
 
 

 

b Rosetta Baume was one of three women in 1919 who stood at short notice when women were able to stand as candidates for election to parliament.

1911 election

1899 election

1890 election

Notes

References

Historical electorates of New Zealand
1860 establishments in New Zealand
1938 disestablishments in New Zealand
1954 disestablishments in New Zealand
1946 establishments in New Zealand